Jennis is a surname. Notable people with the surname include:
 Lucas Jennis (1590–1630), German engraver
 Anne Fleming and Catherine Jennis
 Nellie Jennis and Bob Jennis, fictional characters in The Baby on the Barge, 1915 British silent film

See also 
 Jennison
 Jenni
 Ennis (disambiguation)